Harold Jerry Swarts known as “Clem Harvey” (1919-1988) was a 20th-century film actor. He played one of the Eleven in the original version of Ocean's 11,  Louis Jackson, a Mormon cowboy from Salt Lake City.
Very minimal information is found on Harold and it is speculated that he moved back to live with his family in Tulsa not long after his last filming appearance.
Harold died in 1988 age 68-69 in Tulsa county, Oklahoma and is buried in memorial park cemetery, Tulsa.

Filmography

References

External links
 

American male film actors
Year of birth missing
Possibly living people